Albrights Corner may refer to:

Albrights Corner (Loux Corner) a populated place in Hilltown Township, Bucks County, Pennsylvania, United States
Albrights Corner, New Brunswick, an unincorporated community in New Brunswick, Canada